Søren Thorst (born 8 January 1965) is a retired Danish football defender.

He is a son of Kjeld Thorst.

References

1965 births
Living people
Danish men's footballers
AaB Fodbold players
Ølstykke FC players
Association football defenders
Danish Superliga players